is a deceased Japanese professional shogi player who achieved the rank of 9-dan. He is a former president of the Japan Shogi Association as well as a former Kisei and Ōshō title holder.

References

External links
Shogi Fan: Words of Habu at Futakami’s farewell

Japanese shogi players
Deceased professional shogi players
Recipients of the Medal with Purple Ribbon
Recipients of the Order of the Rising Sun, 4th class
Professional shogi players from Hokkaido
Kisei (shogi)
Ōshō
1932 births
2016 deaths
People from Hakodate
Presidents of the Japan Shogi Association